Prunus × mohacsyana (or Prunus mohacsyana) is a hybrid species of cherry. It is a naturally occurring offspring of dwarf cherry, Prunus fruticosa, and introduced sweet cherry, Prunus avium, found where their ranges overlap in Central Europe. Since they are triploid, they are probably sterile. It was first formally described in 1944 by Zoltán Kárpáti.

References

mohacsyana
Hybrid prunus